Conus guinaicus is a species of predatory sea snail, a marine gastropod mollusk. It is part of the genus Conus, more popularly known as cone snails, cone shells or cones.

Description
The size of an adult shell varies between 21.6 mm and 60 mm. The inflated shell is rather thin. The spire and lower portion of the body whorl are striate. The color of the shell is chestnut or olivaceous, with usually two bands of irregular white cloudings, and scattered white spots. The aperture has a chocolate color, faintly white-banded in the middle.

Distribution
This species occurs in the Atlantic Ocean off Senegal and Gambia.

Gallery

References 

 Pin, M.; Tack, K.D.L. (1995). Les cônes du Sénégal. [The Conidae of Senegal]. La Conchiglia 277(Suppl.): 1–55,
 Tucker J.K. (2009). Recent cone species database. September 4, 2009 Edition
 Filmer R.M. (2001). A Catalogue of Nomenclature and Taxonomy in the Living Conidae 1758 - 1998. Backhuys Publishers, Leiden. 388pp.
 Petuch E.J. & Berschauer D.P. (2018). A new Lautoconus species radiation from Gambia, West Africa. The Festivus. 50(3): 164–172.

External links
 Bruguière J.G. (1789-1792). Encyclopédie méthodique ou par ordre de matières. Histoire naturelle des vers, volume 1. Paris: Pancoucke. Pp. i-xviii, 1-344 [Livraison 32, June 1789; 345-757 [Livraison 48, 13 Feb. 1792 ]
 Kiener, L.C. (1844-1850). Spécies général et iconographie des coquilles vivantes. Vol. 2. Famille des Enroulées. Genre Cone (Conus, Lam.), pp. 1-379, pl. 1-111 [pp. 1-48 (1846); 49-160 (1847); 161-192 (1848); 193-240 (1849); 241-[379(assumed to be 1850); plates 4,6 (1844); 2–3, 5, 7-32, 34–36, 38, 40-50 (1845); 33, 37, 39, 51–52, 54–56, 57–68, 74-77 (1846); 1, 69–73, 78-103 (1847); 104-106 (1848); 107 (1849); 108-111 (1850)]. Paris, Rousseau & J.B. Baillière., available online at http://www.biodiversitylibrary.org/item/88016
page(s): 360, pl. 110 fig. 3]
 Adams A. (1854 ['1853"]). Descriptions of new species of the genus Conus, from the collection of Hugh Cuming, Esq. Proceedings of the Zoological Society of London. 21: 116-119
 Puillandre N., Duda T.F., Meyer C., Olivera B.M. & Bouchet P. (2015). One, four or 100 genera? A new classification of the cone snails. Journal of Molluscan Studies. 81: 1–23
 http://www.coneshell.net/pages/c_guinaicus.htm
 
 Cone Shells – Knights of the Sea

guinaicus
Gastropods described in 1792